Deyi Secondary School is a co-educational government secondary school located in Ang Mo Kio, Singapore. Founded in January 1980,  the school is remarked for its niche development in performing arts. An Aesthetics Development Programme (ADP) forms part of the niche development, which resulted the Direct School Admission (DSA) status. This allows students, both local and abroad, talented in performing arts to be admitted into the school. All lower secondary students have drama and dance modules woven into the curriculum. There is a Talent Development programme leading to accreditation for performing arts students in collaboration with reputable institutions.

History

The school first began operations in January 1980 as Teck Ghee Secondary School, with about 1,700 students. It was located at a  campus along Ang Mo Kio Avenue 8 built at a cost of S$4.6 million. A ceramic studio and a kiln were constructed in 1981.

The school changed its name to Deyi Secondary School in 1982.

Deyi Secondary School then moved into its new premises on 24 June 2002, which were officially opened by Education Minister Tharman Shanmugaratnam on 20 May 2005.

Co-curricular activities 
Deyi has about 20 Co-curricular activities (CCAs) consisting of sports groups, uniformed groups, musical groups, clubs and societies.

The school's performing arts have earned top places in several inter-school competitions, excel in English Drama, Movement and Dance, Military Band and Choir.

The Military Band has won the Gold with honours, Best Drum Major and Best display band of the year in 2008 and 2010.

References

External links
 

Secondary schools in Singapore
Educational institutions established in 1980
Schools in Ang Mo Kio